The Pray Codex, also called Codex Pray or The Hungarian Pray Manuscript, is a collection of medieval manuscripts, dated to the late 12th to early 13th centuries. In 1813 it was named after György Pray, who discovered it in 1770. It is the first known example of continuous prose text in Hungarian. The Codex is kept in the National Széchényi Library of Budapest. 

One of the most well-known documents within the Codex (f. 154a) is the Funeral Sermon and Prayer (Hungarian: Halotti beszéd és könyörgés). It is an old handwritten Hungarian text dating to 1192-1195. The importance of the Funeral Sermon comes from its being the oldest surviving Hungarian, and Uralic, text. 

The Codex also features a missal, an Easter mystery play, songs with musical notation, laws from the time of Coloman of Hungary and the annals, which list the Hungarian kings. 

One of the five illustrations within the Codex shows the body of Jesus being prepared for burial, and also the subsequent Resurrection of Jesus, with an angel showing the empty tomb to the Three Ladies. This illustration shows generic similarities with the Shroud of Turin: Jesus is shown entirely naked with the arms on the pelvis, as in the body image of the Shroud of Turin; the thumbs on the image appear to be retracted, with only four fingers visible on each hand, matching the detail on the Turin Shroud; the supposed fabric shows a herringbone pattern, similar to the weaving pattern of the Shroud; and the four tiny circles on the lower image, which appear to form a letter L, "perfectly reproduce four apparent "poker holes" on the Turin Shroud", which likewise appear to form a letter L. Critics of this idea consider this item to be a rectangular tombstone as seen on other sacred images, and say that the alleged holes are just decorative elements, as seen on the angel's wing and on various items of clothing; that the alleged shroud shows no image of a man, and that a wadded up cloth lies discarded on the tombstone.

References

External links
The scanned Codex at National Széchényi Library websites

Medieval documents of Hungary
12th-century manuscripts
Christian illuminated manuscripts
1190s works